Borisovka is a rural locality (a selo) in Kruglo-Sementsovsky Selsoviet, Yegoryevsky District, Altai Krai, Russia. The population was 200 as of 2013. There are 3 streets.

Geography 
Borisovka is located 26 km south of Novoyegoryevskoye (the district's administrative centre) by road. Shubinka is the nearest rural locality.

References 

Rural localities in Yegoryevsky District, Altai Krai